The Liberty Tower is a high-rise office building in Dayton, Ohio, United States. The  tower was designed by the Dayton architectural firm of Schenck & Williams. The tower is named Liberty Tower after Liberty Savings Bank. Currently, the building hosts a branch of First Financial Bank, this company having bought out a number of Liberty Savings Bank locations.

History
Liberty Tower, previously known as Mutual Home Savings Association Building, was the tallest building in Dayton from 1931 to 1969. At one point it was the property of the owners of the Indianapolis Motor Speedway — the Hulman Family of Terre Haute, Indiana. In 1982 Liberty Tower became listed on the National Register of Historic Places.

See also
 List of tallest buildings in Dayton, Ohio
 National Register of Historic Places listings in Dayton, Ohio

References

External links
 Liberty Tower (Emporis info.)

National Register of Historic Places in Montgomery County, Ohio
Office buildings completed in 1931
Commercial buildings on the National Register of Historic Places in Ohio
Skyscraper office buildings in Dayton, Ohio